is a Japanese four-panel manga series written and illustrated by Rasuko Ōkuma. It has been serialized in Houbunsha's seinen manga magazine Manga Time Kirara since May 2019, with its chapters collected into three tankōbon volumes as of October 2022. An anime television series adaptation by Studio Gokumi is set to premiere in 2023.

Characters

Media

Manga
Written and illustrated by Rasuko Ōkuma, Hoshikuzu Telepath initially started in Houbunsha's Manga Time Kirara magazine on May 9, 2019, as a two-chapter guest work. It began a full serialization in the same magazine on July 9, 2019. The first tankōbon was released on July 27, 2020. As of October 2022, three volumes have been released.

Volume list

Anime
An anime television series adaptation was announced on October 7, 2022. It is produced by Studio Gokumi and directed by Kaori, who will also supervise the scripts with Natsuko Takahashi, and Takahiro Sakai will design the characters and serve as chief animation director. The series is set to premiere in 2023.

Reception
In 2021, the series was nominated in the seventh Next Manga Awards in the Best Printed Manga category.

References

External links
  
 

Anime series based on manga
Extraterrestrials in anime and manga
Houbunsha manga
Science fiction anime and manga
Seinen manga
Studio Gokumi
Upcoming anime television series
Yonkoma
Yuri (genre) anime and manga